Wyndham Knight may refer to

Wyndham William Knight (1828–1918), an English cricketer 
Wyndham Charles Knight (1863–1942), an English soldier, grandson of the above